Pachygonidia odile is a moth of the family Sphingidae which is endemic to Ecuador.

There are probably multiple generations per year.

References

Pachygonidia
Moths described in 2002
Endemic fauna of Ecuador
Moths of South America